The Empire Duet is a two-book series written by Orson Scott Card under license from Chair Entertainment, beginning with Empire in 2006. The sequel Hidden Empire was released December 22, 2009.

Video game
Shadow Complex, released in 2009, is a video game set in the world of The Empire Duet.

See also
 List of works by Orson Scott Card

References

External links

 The official Orson Scott Card website

 
Book series introduced in 2006
Novels by Orson Scott Card
Science fiction book series